Kendra Santacruz (born July 24, 1989, in Cuernavaca, Morelos, Mexico), is a Mexican television actress.

Filmography

Awards and nominations

References

External links 

Living people
Mexican actresses
1989 births
Mexican telenovela actresses
21st-century Mexican actresses
Actresses from Morelos
People from Cuernavaca